Pio Campa (1881–1964) was an Italian stage and film actor. He was married to the actress Wanda Capodaglio.

Selected filmography
 Paradise (1932)
 The Two Orphans (1942)
 Jealousy (1942)
 La Fornarina (1944)

References

Bibliography
 Susan Bassnett & Jennifer Lorch. Luigi Pirandello in the Theatre. Routledge, 2014.

External links

1881 births
1964 deaths
Italian male film actors
Italian male stage actors
Actors from Florence